The Dhole or mountain wolf (Cuon alpinus) is a canid species native to Asia.

Mountain wolf may also refer to:

 Northern Rocky Mountain wolf (Canis lupus irremotus)
 Southern Rocky Mountain wolf (Canis lupus youngi)
 Cascade mountain wolf (Canis lupus fuscus) 
 Mogollon mountain wolf (Canis lupus mogollonensis), an extinct subspecies of gray wolf

See also
 Wolf mount (disambiguation)
 Rocky Mountain wolf (disambiguation)

Animal common name disambiguation pages